James Harvey Ward (born July 31, 1978) is an American actor, most known for portraying Michael on AMC's Low Winter Sun, Felton Norris on HBO's True Blood and Madden on the MyNetworkTV limited-run serial Saints & Sinners. He is a Lifetime Member of The Actors Studio

Filmography 
 Road to Paloma (2013)
 10,000 Days (2014)
 Patriots Day (2017)

External links 

1978 births
American male film actors
American male television actors
Living people